Anahata (IAST:) or heart chakra is the fourth primary chakra, according to Hindu Yogic, Shakta and Buddhist Tantric traditions. In Sanskrit, anahata means "unhurt, unstruck, and unbeaten". Anahata Nad refers to the Vedic concept of unstruck sound (the sound of the celestial realm). Anahata is associated with balance, calmness, and serenity.

Etymology 
In Sanskrit Anahata means "sound produced without touching two parts" and at the same time it means "pure" or "clean, stainless". The name of this chakra signifies the state of freshness that appears when we are able to become detached and to look at the different and apparently contradictory experiences of life with a state of openness (expansion). Normally we are not used to the effect produced by the confrontation of the two opposite forces. At the level of Anahata chakra appears the possibility to integrate the two opposite forces and obtain the effect (sound, in this case), without the two forces being confronted (without touching of the two parts). This energy is specific to cooperation and integration, which brings peace and a new perspective in a world which, up to this level (considering only the energies specific to the first three centres of force: Muladhara, Swasdhistana and Manipura) was made only of a more or less conscious confrontation between opposite forces. The name Anahata suggests, in fact, the synergetic effect of the interaction of energies at this level.

Description

Location 
The heart chakra is located in the central channel of the spine near the heart.

Appearance 
Anahata is represented by a lotus flower with twelve petals. Inside there is a smoky region at the intersection of two triangles, creating a shatkona. The shatkona is a symbol used in Hindu Yantra, representing the union of male and female. Specifically, it is meant to represent Purusha (the Supreme Being) and Prakriti (Nature). The deity of this area is Vayu, who is smoke-like and four-armed, holding a kusha and riding an antelope (this chakra's animal).

Seed mantra 
The seed syllable is the dark-grey mantra "yam". In the bindu (or dot) above the syllable is the deity Isha. Isha is bright white or blue in color. He has either one or five faces, with three eyes on each face. He may have two, four or ten arms. He is clad in a tiger skin, holds a trident and drum, grants blessings, and dispels fear. His shakti is Kakini, who is shining yellow or rose-coloured. She has a number of variations: one, three or six faces; two or four arms; and holds a variety of implements (occasionally a sword, shield, skull or trident). She is seated on a red lotus.

Petals 
The twelve petals are inscribed with the following Sanskrit syllables. (Note: In some representations the syllables or else the petals themselves are colored vermillion.)  
 kam
 kham
 gam
 gham
 ngam
 cham
 chham
 jam
 jham
 nyam
 tam 
tham

The syllables may be thought as matching twelve vrittis or divine qualities of the heart as follows.
 bliss
 peace
 harmony
 love
 understanding
 empathy
 clarity
 purity
 unity
 compassion
 kindness 
 forgiveness

Even more commonly, systems of understanding identify these vrittis as corresponding with various reflexive modifications away from the indifferentiated divine mind, each one considered as arising from spiritual ignorance, as below.
 asha: wish, desire, hope
 cinta: thoughtfulness, anxiety
 cesta: effort
 mamta: possessiveness, fondness
 dhamba: arrogance, vanity
 viveka: discrimination
 vikalata: languor
 ahamkara: conceit, egoism, pride
 lolata: covetousness, avarice
 kapatata: duplicity, hypocrisy
 vitarka: indecision, argumentativeness
 anutapa: regret, burning misery

William Enckhausen defines half of these vrittis as spiritual ignorances and half spiritual developments. "Half the 12 vrttis of the Anahata are 'positive', growth promoting vrttis and the other half are 'negative' or at most neutral, self-justifying defense tendencies that perpetuate the ego's limited boundaries instead of expanding and refining them. There is still a limited and bounded sense of self, but with the potential to discriminate between vice and virtue. There is also still the boundary of self and not self to be overcome, although not as marked as in the Manipura and Svadhistana. Harmony, balance, and proportion are key elements in this fulcrum that is the Anahata to help determine what is growth-promoting and virtuous (self, or good for the self) and what is vice, or inappropriate for spiritual self-growth (not self)." Enckhausen's translations follow.
 hope 
 worry 
 endeavor 
 affection 
 vanity 
 discernment 
 depression 
 self-identity 
 selfishness 
 duplicity 
 contention 
 compunction

Function 
Anahata is considered to be the seat of the Jivatman and Parashakti. In the Upanishads, this is described as a tiny flame inside the heart. Anahata is named as such because sages were believed to hear the sound (Anahata –  comes without the striking of two objects together). It is associated with air, touch and the actions of the hands.

Anahata is associated with the ability to make decisions outside the realm of karma. In Manipura and below, man is bound by the laws of karma and fate. In Anahata one makes decisions ("follows one's heart") based on one's higher self, not the unfulfilled emotions and desires of lower nature. As such, it is known as the heart chakra. It is also associated with love and compassion, charity to others and psychic healing. Meditation on this chakra is said to bring about the following siddhis (abilities): he becomes a lord of speech, he is dear to women, his presence controls the senses of others, and he can leave and enter the body at will.

Hrit (Hridaya, Surya) chakra 

Immediately below Anahata (at the solar plexus or, sometimes, on the near left side of the body) is a minor chakra known as Hrit (or Hridaya, "heart"), with eight petals. It has three regions: a vermilion sun region, within which is a white moon region, within which is a deep-red fire region. Within this is the red wish-fulfilling tree, kalpavriksha, which symbolises the ability to manifest what one wishes to happen in the world.

Hrit chakra is sometimes known as the Surya (sun) chakra, which is located slightly to the left below the heart. Its role is to absorb energy from the sun and provide heat to the body and the other chakras (to Manipura in particular, to which it provides Agni' (fire).

 Practices 
In Yogic practices, anahata is awakened and balanced by asanas, pranayamas and the practice of ajapa japa (japa, without the mental effort normally needed to repeat the mantra) and purified by bhakti (devotion).

There are also concentration practices for awakening the Anāhata chakra.

 Comparisons with other systems 

 Tibetan Buddhism 
The heart wheel in Tibetan Buddhism is the location of the indestructible red-and-white drop. At death, the winds of the body dissolve and enter this drop, which then leads the body into Bardo (the intermediate stage) and rebirth. The heart wheel in this model is circular, white and has eight petals (or channels) reaching downwards. These channels divide into three wheels (mind, speech and body) and go to 24 places in the body. They again divide into three and then into 1,000, producing 72,000 channels (known as Nadi) throughout the body.

The heart wheel is important in meditation; in the lower tantras, the mantra is recited from the heart. It is recited verbally and then mentally; then, in the heart, a tiny moon disc and flame are imagined from which the mantra rings. In the higher tantras (the Anuttarayoga Tantra of the Sarma schools) or the Inner Tantras of the Nyingma school, the practitioner attempts to dissolve the winds and drops into the central channel at the level of the heart to experience the Yoga of Clear Light; this is a practice of the Six Yogas of Naropa. In Tibetan Buddhism there is a chakra, the Fire Wheel, above the heart and below the throat.

 Sufism 
Sufis have a system of Lataif-e-sitta at a number of points on the body; at the heart, there are three positioned horizontally. On the left side of the chest is the Qalb (the heart); the Ruḥ is on the right side of the chest, and the Sirr (innermost heart) is between them.

The Qalb is called the heart of the mystic''; it is caught between the downward pull of the lower nafs, and the upward pull of the spirit of Allah and may be blackened by sin. It may be purified by reciting the names of God. The Ruḥ is the centre of the spirit, the breath of Allah; when awakened, it counteracts the negative pull of the nafs. The Sirr is the innermost heart, where Allah manifests his mystery to himself.

See also 
 
 
 Hexagram in Indian religions – Cosmological diagrams in Hinduism, Buddhism, and Jainism

References

Works cited

Further reading

External links 
 Description of Anahata Chakra from Kheper.net

Chakras
Hindu philosophical concepts